RK University (RKU) is a private university in Rajkot, Gujarat, India. It was created by the state of Gujarat under the Private State University Act by a gazetted notification dated 12 October 2011, along with three other universities. On Rajkot-Bhavnagar Highway, in a campus of nearly 100 acres, RK University has been functioning as RK Group of Colleges since 2005, offering degrees in engineering, pharmacy, physiotherapy, and in management studies. It has more than 5500 students. The campus offers hostel facilities for nearly 1200 students.

Academics 
RK University offers a variety of undergraduate and postgraduate courses in the fields of medicine, health sciences, pharmacy, engineering, computer Application, management, sciences, agriculture and design. It also offers doctoral studies programs.

Events 
Galore is the annual sports and cultural festival of the university. It is normally organized in February by students and faculty. Huge number of students from other local colleges take part in the festival.  RK University celebrates its foundation day every year in October. Apart from these two main events, RK University celebrates techno-cultural and physio-cultural events every year.

References

External links
 

Education in Rajkot
Universities in Gujarat
Private universities in India
2011 establishments in Gujarat
Educational institutions established in 2011